The 2014–15 TFF First League, also known as PTT First League due to sponsoring reasons, is the 14th season since the league was established in 2001 and 52nd season of the second-level football league of Turkey since its establishment in 1963–64. Before start of this season Ankaraspor changed her name as Osmanlıspor and her colours as violet-white.

Teams 
Elazığspor, Antalyaspor and Kayserispor relegated from Süper Lig.
İstanbul B.B., Balıkesirspor and Mersin İ.Y. promoted to 2014–15 Süper Lig.
Altınordu, Giresunspor and Alanyaspor promoted from TFF Second League.
Fethiyespor, 1461 Trabzon, Tavşanlı Linyitspor and Kahramanmaraşspor relegated to 2014–15 TFF Second League.

Stadia and locations

League table

Results

Promotion Playoffs

Semifinals

First leg

Second leg

Final

Attendances 

Updated to games played on 1 June 2015.
Source:ntvspor

Statistics

Top goalscorers

Top assists

See also 
 2014–15 Turkish Cup
 2014–15 Süper Lig
 2014–15 TFF Second League
 2014–15 TFF Third League

References

External links 
  Turkish Football Federation PTT 1. League

TFF First League seasons
Turkey
1